Blum Lakes are located in North Cascades National Park, in the U. S. state of Washington. Consisting of approximately six cirque lakes immediately southwest of Mount Blum, the Blum Lakes are not near any maintained trails. Outflow from the lakes feeds into a tributary of Blum Creek. Nearby the Blum Basin Falls plunges  along another tributary of Blum Creek.

References

Lakes of Washington (state)
North Cascades National Park
Lakes of Whatcom County, Washington